Interiors is the second studio album by the American rock band Brad. It was released on June 24, 1997, through Epic Records.

Recording
The album's recording sessions took place from December 1996 to January 1997 at Studio Litho in Seattle, Washington. Studio Litho is owned by guitarist Stone Gossard. The band worked with producer Nick DiDia. The album was mixed by DiDia and Brendan O'Brien. The album featured a more polished sound compared with the band's debut album, Shame.

Release
Interiors was met with poor sales, however the band saw its cult audience expand. The lead single from Interiors, "The Day Brings", features Mike McCready from Pearl Jam on lead guitar. The album charted at number 30 on Billboard'''s Top Heatseekers chart. A music video was made for the song "The Day Brings". Interiors was accompanied by a tour in the United States and Canada in 1997, as well as a small tour in Australia and New Zealand in 1998.

Reception
Stephen Thomas Erlewine of AllMusic awarded the album three stars. He wrote "Given its title, it perhaps shouldn't come as a surprise that Interiors is an introspective collection, but its tempered sound is somewhat of a shock when considering the grunge background of the entire band." Erlewine compared the album's sound to 1970s soft rock, which contrasts Gossard's primary band Pearl Jam, whose sound is more reminiscent of 1970s hard rock. Tom Moon of Rolling Stone said that "what's most notable about Interiors''...is the pure pop focus of these nuanced compositions."

Track listing

Japanese bonus tracks

Personnel

Brad
Stone Gossard – guitars, painting
Regan Hagar – drums, package design
Shawn Smith – vocals, piano, organ
Jeremy Toback – bass guitar

Additional musicians and production
Matt Bayles – recording
Brad – production
Nick DiDia – production, recording, mixing
Shelly Gossard – production coordination
Bashiri Johnson – percussion
Steve Marcusson – mastering
Mike McCready – additional guitar on "The Day Brings"
Lance Mercer, Fabienne Toback, Harry Wirth – photos
Brendan O'Brien – mixing, additional keyboards on "I Don't Know", additional guitar on "Lift", "I Don't Know", and "Some Never Come Home"
John Riegart, Tom Schick, Ryan Williams, Mike Wilson – assistance
Wendy Sutter – cello on "Upon My Shoulders"

Charts

References

Interiors (Brad)
Interiors
Interiors (Brad)
Albums produced by Stone Gossard